Daniel Griffin George (July 7, 1840 – February 26, 1916) alias William Smith was a Union Navy sailor in the American Civil War who received the U.S. military's highest decoration, the Medal of Honor.

Military service

George was born in Plaistow, New Hampshire, on July 7, 1840. He first served during the Civil War in Company D, 1st Massachusetts Cavalry; enlisting September 16, 1861, for three years; mustered on September 17, 1861, as a Private; appointed 1st Sergeant February 8, 1863; re-enlisted January 1, 1864. He was discharged April 26, 1866, as a Coxswain from the Chicopee.

Medal of Honor citation
Rank and organization: Ordinary Seaman, U.S. Navy. (alias William Smith.), Accredited to: New Hampshire, G.O. No.: 45, 31 December 1864.

George's official Medal of Honor citation reads:
George served on board U.S. Picket Boat No. 1, in action near Plymouth, North Carolina, 27 October 1864, against the Confederate ram, Albemarle, which had resisted repeated attacks by our steamers and had kept a large force of vessels employed in watching her. The picket boat, equipped with a spar torpedo, succeeded in passing the enemy pickets within 20 yards without being discovered and then made for the Albemarle under a full head of steam. Immediately taken under fire by the ram, the small boat plunged on, jumped the log boom which encircled the target and exploded its torpedo under the port bow of the ram. The picket boat was destroyed by enemy fire and almost the entire crew taken prisoner or lost.

Death and burial
Medal of Honor recipient Daniel G. George died at Amesbury, Massachusetts on February 26, 1916, of a cerebral hemorrhage and was buried at the Locust Grove Cemetery in Merrimac, Massachusetts.

References

External links

1840 births
1916 deaths
People from Plaistow, New Hampshire
Burials in Massachusetts
People of New Hampshire in the American Civil War
Union Navy sailors
United States Navy Medal of Honor recipients
American Civil War recipients of the Medal of Honor